Events in the year 1979 in Germany.

Incumbents
President – Walter Scheel (until 30 June), Karl Carstens (starting 1 July)
Chancellor – Helmut Schmidt

Events 
 20 February - 3 March - 29th Berlin International Film Festival
 March 17 - Germany in the Eurovision Song Contest 1979
 March 18 - Rhineland-Palatinate state election, 1979
 March 18 - West Berlin state election, 1979	
 June 10 - European Parliament election, 1979 (West Germany)

 undated: Neue Deutsche Welle, a pop musical genre, spreads throughout the land.

Births

7 January - Christian Lindner, German politician
10 January - Maximilian Brückner, German actor
13 January - Joko Winterscheidt, German television presenter
21 January - Sebastian Schindzielorz, German footballer
29 January - Sarah Kuttner, German television presenter and author
2 February - Klaus Mainzer, German rugby player
6 February - Alice Weidel, German politician
12 March - Tim Wieskötter, German canoeist
20 April - Fady Maalouf, Lebanese-born singer and runner-up of Deutschland sucht den Superstar (season 5)
25 May - Elli Erl, singer and winner of Deutschland sucht den Superstar (season 2)
26 May - Jonas Reckermann, German beach volleyball player
29 May - Arne Friedrich, German football player 
14 June - Constantin Schreiber, German journalist
10 July - Tobias Unger, German athlete
14 July - Robin Szolkowy, pair skater
24 August - Markus Walger, rugby player
24 August - Markus Walger, German rugby player
25 August - Philipp Mißfelder, German politician (died 2015)
27 August - Ole Bischof, German judoka
5 November - Colin Grzanna, German rugby player and surgeon
2 December - Yvonne Catterfeld, German singer
21 December - Bert Tischendorf, German actor
Undated: Dennis Rudolph, conceptual artist

Deaths

4 January - Peter Frankenfeld, German comedian (born 1913)
22 March - Paul Nevermann, German politician (born 1902)
2 April - Erich Rademacher, German swimmer (born 1901)
14 May - Heinz Pollay, German equestrian (born 1908)
1 June - Werner Forssmann, German physician (born 1904)
3 June - Arno Schmidt, German author and translator (born 1914)
5 June - Heinz Erhardt, German comedian (born 1909)
8 June - Reinhard Gehlen, German general and intelligent officer (born 1902)
15 June - Ernst Meister, German writer (born 1911)	
26 June - Franz-Josef Röder, German politician (born 1909)
28 June - Paul Dessau, German conductor and composer (born 1894)
6 August - Feodor Felix Konrad Lynen, German biochemist (born 1911)
12 August - Ernst Boris Chain, German biochemist (born 1906)
24 August – Hanna Reitsch, German soldier and pilot (born 1912)
12 September - Josef Müller, German politician (born 1898)
1 December - Max Jacobson, German physician (born 1900)
4 December - Friedrich Ebert Jr., German politician (born 1894)
 11 December - Carlo Schmid, German politician (born 1896)
 13 December - Alfred Bengsch, German cardinal of Roman Catholic Church (born 1921)
19 December - Wilhelm Kaisen, German politician (born 1887)
24 December - Rudi Dutschke, German radical student leader (born 1940)

See also
1979 in German television

References

 
Years of the 20th century in Germany
1970s in Germany
Germany
Germany